Eric Gillette (born August 14, 1984) is an American multi-instrumentalist from Dallas, Texas. He is the lead guitarist, vocalist and keyboardist for the Neal Morse Band as well as a solo artist and session musician. Although primarily a guitarist, he often plays keyboards and drums as part of his professional work.

Biography

Gillette began taking piano lessons as a child and learned to play the guitar as a teenager. His father and aunt taught him chords, and he spent time jamming with his aunt's bluegrass band. In 2010, he began playing guitar and providing background vocals for The Swon Brothers, three years before their appearance on The Voice. He went on to play electric guitar for their album The Swon Brothers. He married his wife, Jaci Lynn, on October 10, 2014, about a year after they met at a Swon Brothers show.

Gillette's musical influences include Steve Vai, Joe Satriani, John Petrucci, and Eric Johnson. He is also a fan of and inspired by former Dream Theater drummer Mike Portnoy.

In April 2012, Gillette auditioned to play guitar, keyboards, and vocals for The Neal Morse Band. After winning one of the two guitar slots in the band, he served as a guest vocalist on Morse's 2012 album Momentum and played on that album's world tour. Gillette contributed guitars, vocals, and songwriting to the first Neal Morse Band album, The Grand Experiment, in 2015, and its second, 2016's The Similitude of a Dream. That album was awarded Album of the Year 2016 by The Prog Report, which applauded "the talents of guitar virtuoso Eric Gillette."

Gillette has been active as a solo artist. In 2013, he released his first solo album, Afterthought, playing all instruments with guest appearances by Neal Morse Band mates Randy George and Bill Hubauer on bass and synthesizers, respectively. His second solo album, The Great Unknown, was released in May 2016 and includes drummer Thomas Lang and Haken band members Conner Green and Diego Tejeida on bass and keys.

In 2017, Gillette was invited by drummer and Neal Morse Band colleague Mike Portnoy to be the lead guitarist for his series of "Shattered Fortress" shows, which included the first complete live performances of Dream Theater's Twelve-step Suite. He also joined Portnoy for a series of Liquid Tension Experiment sets, featuring himself on guitar and Diego Tejeida from Haken.
Also that year, Gillette worked with the Tree of Life Project, providing drums, keyboards, and mixing for its first album, Awakening Call.

Discography

Solo
 Afterthought (Feb. 18, 2013; self-released)
 The Great Unknown (Jun. 2, 2016; self-released)

With Neal Morse
 Momentum (2012) – additional vocals on "Thoughts Part 5"
 Live Momentum (2013) – vocals, electric guitar, keyboards
 Morsefest 2014 (2015) – vocals, electric guitar
 Jesus Christ the Exorcist (2019) – drums, electric guitar
 Sola Gratia (2020)

With The Neal Morse Band
 The Grand Experiment (2015) – vocals, electric guitar, songwriting
 The Similitude of a Dream (2016) – vocals, electric guitar, songwriting
 Morsefest 2015 (2017) – vocals, electric guitar
 The Great Adventure (2019) – vocals, electric guitar, songwriting
 Innocence & Danger (2021) - vocals, electric guitar, songwriting

With The Swon Brothers
 The Swon Brothers (2014) – electric guitar

With Tree of life
 Awakening Call (2017) – drums, keyboards

With Lazleitt
 On the Brink (2018) – lead guitar, mixing & mastering
 Perpetually Under Idle Grounds (2019) – drums, lead guitar, mixing & mastering

With Patema
 Fathom (2019) – Mixing & mastering

References

External links 
 

1984 births
Living people
American rock guitarists
American male guitarists
21st-century American guitarists
21st-century American male musicians